TWA Flight 260 was the Trans World Airlines (TWA) designation for a flight from Albuquerque, New Mexico to Santa Fe, New Mexico. On February 19, 1955, the 40-passenger Martin 4-0-4 prop plane used by TWA for that route crashed into the Sandia Mountains. Its deviation from the normal flight path, initially believed to be the result of pilot error, was revised to "unknown" given that the contribution of other factors could not be definitively ruled out.

History 
On February 19, 1955 at 7:03 am, TWA flight 260 en route from Albuquerque, New Mexico to Santa Fe, New Mexico received an IFR clearance from the Albuquerque tower ("ATC clears TWA 260 for approach at the Santa Fe Airport via Victor 19 climb northbound on the back course of the ILS localizer"). There were no further communications after the aircraft took off at 7:05. It was last seen in a high-speed shallow climb toward the cloud-shrouded Sandia Crest at an estimated altitude of 3,000 feet above ground level.

At 7:13 the flight crashed into Sandia Mountain killing all 13 passengers and three crew members on board instantly. Authorities were not aware of the crash until the next morning when a cargo pilot spotted the wreckage.  Due to the complex mountainous terrain, several members of the New Mexico Mountain Club, along with other volunteers, assisted the New Mexico State Police in the recovery efforts. This later led to the formation of the Albuquerque Mountain Rescue Council, a volunteer organization still active today. Mountaineers George Boatman and Frank Powers were the first people to reach the crash site.

Investigation 
The initial Civil Aeronautics Board (CAB) Accident Investigation Report was released on October 12, 1955. Originally the cause was believed to be that the pilots were "intentionally flying the plane into the mountain". This initial CAB "probable cause" adopted a widespread rumor: it implied a "suicide pact" between the two airline pilots. An amended accident report was released by CAB on August 26, 1957, which deleted the word "intentional".

Captain Larry DeCelles worked cooperatively with the CAB's investigators to understand pilot reports of latent faults in a fluxgate compass that only appeared after extended intervals with turn bank-angle. After these investigations, the CAB issued a third version of the report on June 15, 1960. The updated report listed the probable cause as “deviation from the prescribed flight path for reasons unknown” given that malfunction of the fluxgate compass as a contributing factor could not be entirely ruled out.

On  May 14 members of the New Mexico Mountain Club who had participated in the initial recovery effort returned to the site to recover and bury any human remains left at the site before the summer climbing season. They collected over 150 pounds of remains and also recovered a Fluxgate compass from the remains of the left wing tip where it had been left by the impact. Because of a design wiring defect both the pilot's and copilot's RMI gauges were driven by the same Fluxgate compass which was the one recovered. As a result, there was no opportunity for either pilot to be aware of the erroneous data displayed on their RMIs. While "in order to accept the theory offered, the Board must conclude that both crew members were completely oblivious to all these [countervailing] indications, that their attention was focused entirely on the RMI, and that they did not cross-check any other flight instruments", this evidence convinced the CAB to amend the accident report to include instrument error as a possible contributing factor. The CAB's third version of their Accident Report discussed their willingness to work cooperatively with experts from the airline and the pilots' association toward revising its previous report.

Wreckage and Recovery 
Wreckage from the craft still remains, and can still be seen on brightly lit days by riders on the Sandia Peak Tramway, a popular tourist attraction active since 1966. Charles Williams along with relatives and descendants of the victims placed a memorial plaque at the crash site. The location is locally referred to as "TWA Canyon", and the ridge that Flight 260 struck is known locally as "Dragons Tooth".

The bodies of victims were recovered over the span of four days, and TWA recovered the tail section of the aircraft, but the remaining wreckage was left on the mountain.

Aftermath 
Captain Spong's wife, Jean Spong, began receiving harassing phone calls and mail in the aftermath of the crash, especially once the initial CAB report was released. Additionally, her son was bullied at school by other kids. Eventually, Jean and her son moved from Kansas City to Phoenix to live with her husband's sister and cousin in order to get away from the harassment. As per New Mexico law at the time, the insurance claims for the passengers was limited to $10,000 per victim. These payments were to be paid by the airline.

References

External links 

 Civil Aeronautics Board
 Final accident report - June 9, 1960 - PDF
Albuquerque Mountain Rescue Council
Sandia Peak

Airliner accidents and incidents caused by instrument failure
260
Accidents and incidents involving the Martin 4-0-4
Airliner accidents and incidents in New Mexico
Aviation accidents and incidents in 1955
Aviation accidents and incidents involving controlled flight into terrain
History of Bernalillo County, New Mexico
1955 in New Mexico
February 1955 events in the United States
Aviation accidents and incidents in the United States in 1955